is a Japanese football player for FC Gifu.

Career
After joining from Josai International University, Ono didn't play a single pro-match for JEF United Chiba, being basically the 3rd choice goalkeeper. This went on until 2018 season, when manager Juan Esnáider gave him space in the 2nd part of the year: Ono debuted against Renofa Yamaguchi, playing several matches in a row.

Club statistics
Updated to 25 October 2018.

References

External links

Profile at JEF United Chiba
Profile at J. League

1993 births
Living people
Association football people from Shimane Prefecture
Japanese footballers
J2 League players
JEF United Chiba players
Tochigi SC players
FC Gifu players
Association football goalkeepers